Gene Kelly: Anatomy of a Dancer is a documentary on the life and death of Gene Kelly. It was shown on American Masters on PBS in 2002.

External links

Gene Kelly: Anatomy of a Dancer on PBS website

2002 television films
2002 films
American documentary television films
American Masters films
2000s American films